The Canadian Xtreme Paintball League (CXPL) was the top professional X-Ball league in Canada. It contained three conferences:
Eastern, which consists of Quebec, and the Maritimes
Central, which consists of Ontario
Western, which consists of Manitoba, Saskatchewan, Alberta and British Columbia
Players were not required to live within those boundaries to play in a conference, but generally all events for each conference are held there.

There were four divisions of play in the Canadian Xtreme Paintball League: CXBL Elite, MXL, RXL, RT5 and CX5. Each year, the top team in each division (with the exception of CX5) is promoted to the higher division, and the bottom-placed team is relegated to the division below (again, with the exception of CX5).

The CXBL was founded in 2005. At that time it consisted of just two divisions: the Ontario Xball League (OXBL) and the Quebec Xball League (QXBL). After the first year, the league expanded to include a Western Conference, and the OXBL and QXBL were renamed the Central and Eastern Conferences, respectively. The Western and Atlantic Conferences later folded after the 2011 and 2012 season, respectively. Each year, the CXBL has expanded to include new divisions. MXL was added in 2006, CX4 (later renamed CX5) was added in 2007, RXL was added in 2008, and RT5, which uses the RaceTo5 format with 10bps ramping, was added for the 2013 season. This allowed a greater number of franchised teams to compete in the league, and greatly increased the league's exposure in global paintball media outlets.  

The league claimed to be the only league in the world to utilize the "original Xball format". CXBL games utilized two 25-minute halves, 15 balls-per-second ramping, or semi auto, and full 2:00 and 5:00 penalties.

Teams 
The CXBL was a "closed division" league, meaning the number of teams in a division did not change during the season as teams committed to playing an entire season. Each team competed for a place in the NAX Cup Finals to determine a series winner. Teams from the previous season have first rights on the teams for the following season, similar to a franchise system.

The NAX Cup Championship Finals 
Every year the top teams in each conference enter into the NAX Cup Championship. The Cup itself is honorarily called the Richmond Cup, after the creator of XBall Richmond Italia.  

Past champions
2015 – Toronto Rockstar
2014 – London Vicious
2013 – Windsor Lockdown
2012 – Tremblant Cowboys
2011 – Windsor Lockdown
2010 – Kingsey Falls Kamikaze
2009 – Edmonton Prevail
2008 – Edmonton Impact
2007 – Edmonton Impact
2006 – Edmonton Impact
2005 – Montreal Shock

References

Paintball leagues